The Apostolic Nunciature to France is an ecclesiastical office of the Catholic Church in France. It is a diplomatic post of the Holy See, whose representative is called the Apostolic Nuncio with the rank of an ambassador.

History of the Nunciature
The early twentieth century was a very difficult time in France-Vatican relations because of tensions over Church-State separation (laïcité) and anticlericalism, which were condemned by Pius X, and which led to the freezing of relations.

However, relations were renewed after the First World War and had very much improved, after the Second World War, under the presidency of Charles de Gaulle. There was controversy over relations under the Vichy regime, because the regime rewarded the Church even though some bishops sometimes opposed antisemitism.

Relations with the Sarkozy government were relatively good, given the fact that the government has announced an end to the ban on recognition of higher Christian institutions.

On 30 September 2019, it was revealed that then nuncio Luigi Ventura, who has been under investigation for sex abuse, was no longer living in France and now resides in Rome, Italy. On 17 December 2019, Pope Francis accepted Ventura's resignation, which he submitted upon turning 75 on 9 December. On 11 January 2020, Pope Francis appointed recent Russian nuncio Celestino Migliore nuncio to France.

Apostolic Nuncios to France

See also
France-Holy See relations

References

External links
 
 

France
Holy See
Catholic Church in France
France–Holy See relations